KTL could refer to:

 KTL (band), a US duo musical project based in France, originally for the theatrical production "Kindertotenlieder"
 KTL (album), self-titled album by KTL

Acronyms
 KTL, ("Kansanterveyslaitos"), the National Public Health Institute of Finland
 Chemical Workers' Union (Finland), a Finnish former trade union
 KTL, Korean Testing Lab (:ko:한국산업기술시험원), Ministry of Trade, Industry and Energy (South Korea)
 kai ta loipa (και τα λοιπα) Greek abbreviation for "and the rest"

Codes
 Kirton Lindsey railway station, National Rail station code KTL
 Kitale Airport, Kenya IATA airport code KTL 
 Koroshi language; ISO 639-3 language code KTL 
 Kwun Tong line, which is one of the line's initial in Hong Kong Mass Transit Railway system.